KMYL-LD (channel 14) is a low-power television station in Lubbock, Texas, United States, affiliated with MyNetworkTV. It is owned by Gray Television alongside NBC affiliate KCBD (channel 11) and Wolfforth-licensed CW+ affiliate KLCW-TV (channel 22), as well as three other low-power stations—Class A Telemundo affiliate KXTQ-CD (channel 46), Snyder-licensed Heroes & Icons affiliate KABI-LD (channel 42), and MeTV affiliate KLBB-LD (channel 48). Gray also provides certain services Fox affiliate KJTV-TV (channel 34) and low-power Class A independent KJTV-CD (channel 32) under a shared services agreement (SSA) with SagamoreHill Broadcasting. KMYL-LD, KLCW-TV, KJTV-TV, KABI-LD, KLBB-LD, KXTQ-CD and KJTV-CD share studios at 98th Street and University Avenue in south Lubbock, where KMYL-LD's transmitter is also located.

The station can also be viewed in portions of the Lubbock, Albuquerque, New Mexico and Odessa, Texas media markets via the second digital subchannel of former sister station KUPT in Hobbs, New Mexico. To cover more of its home market, KMYL-LD is also simulcast on the second subchannel of KLCW-TV.

Subchannels
The station's digital signal is multiplexed:

References

External links

 

MyNetworkTV affiliates
Cozi TV affiliates
MYL-LD
Television channels and stations established in 1989
Gray Television
Low-power television stations in the United States